Maynor may refer to:

Surname
Eric Maynor, American basketball player
Connell Maynor, American football player and coach
Dorothy Maynor, American soprano
Eugene Maynor, American coach
Helen Maynor Scheirbeck, Native American educator and activist
Jordan Maynor, American politician
Kevin Maynor, American opera singer

Given name

Maynor Figueroa, Honduran footballer
Maynor Suazo, Honduran footballer
Maynor Dávila,  Guatemalan footballer

Places

Maynor, West Virginia